Santa Maria Assunta is a Romanesque and Gothic-style, Roman Catholic church located in the town of Ussita, province of Macerata, region of Marche, Italy.

History 
The church was built in the 14th century. The façade had a rose window and narrow peaked lateral windows. The interior has 15th-century frescoes by Paolo da Visso and 16th-century frescoes by Camillo and Fabio Angelucci. The church suffered grave damage from the 2016 earthquake.

References 

Romanesque architecture in le Marche
Gothic architecture in le Marche
14th-century Roman Catholic church buildings in Italy
Ussita
Ussita